Oleh Oleksandrovych Karamushka (born 30 April 1984) is a Ukrainian football defender.

Club career

Early years
Karamushka is a product of Dnipro Cherkasy youth school system.

Tavriya Simferopol
On 19 August 2008, Karamushka signed a two-year contract with Tavriya Simferopol as a free agent.

International career
Karamushka was a member of the Ukrainian national youth teams.

References

External links
 
 
 

1984 births
Living people
Ukrainian footballers
Association football defenders
Ukraine under-21 international footballers
Ukrainian Premier League players
Ukrainian First League players
Ukrainian Second League players
Ukrainian expatriate footballers
Expatriate footballers in Belarus
Ukrainian expatriate sportspeople in Belarus
FC Dnipro players
FC Dnipro-2 Dnipropetrovsk players
FC Dnipro-3 Dnipropetrovsk players
FC Borysfen Boryspil players
FC Borysfen-2 Boryspil players
FC Desna Chernihiv players
FC Shakhtar Donetsk players
FC Shakhtar-2 Donetsk players
FC Metalurh Zaporizhzhia players
FC Kharkiv players
SC Tavriya Simferopol players
FC Obolon-Brovar Kyiv players
FC Dnepr Mogilev players
FC Minsk players
FC Krymteplytsia Molodizhne players
FC Belshina Bobruisk players
FC Vitebsk players
FC Livyi Bereh Kyiv players